Didier Theys (born 19 October 1956) is a Belgian sports car driver. He is a two-time overall winner of the 24 Hours of Daytona (1998 and 2002); a winner of the 12 Hours of Sebring (1998); the Sports Racing Prototype driver champion of the Grand-American Road Racing Association (2002) and the winner of the 24 Hours of Spa (1987 in a factory BMW). He was also the polesitter (1996) and a podium finisher at the 24 Hours of Le Mans (1997, 1998 and 1999). The podium finish in 1999 was a third overall in the factory Audi R8R with co-drivers Emanuele Pirro and Frank Biela. Theys' first appearance at Le Mans was in 1982, while his last start in the world's most famous endurance sports car race came 20 years later in 2002.

Formula racing

Theys won the Belgium Karting championship in 1977. Later he competed in several feeder formulae: he won several Formula Ford championships in the late 1970s and early 1980s; the U.S. Bosch Super Vee championship in 1986; and the American Racing Series (now Indy Lights) championship in 1987. He was also successful in the European Formula Three Championship and Formula 2 in the 1980s. He finished third in the Monaco Formula 3 Grand Prix in 1985.

Theys competed in the CART Indy Car Series from 1987 to 1993 with 47 career starts, including the Indianapolis 500 three times (1989, 1990 and 1993). He finished in the top ten 10 times in CART events, and his best career finish in that series was a third position in Miami in 1988.

IMSA
Theys ran the IMSA GT Championship in 1995 on a Ferrari 333SP. He finished fourth in 1996, 11th in 1997 and 6th in the series' final season in 1998.

1998 season
Theys' 1998 victories at Daytona and Sebring came in the Kevin Doran-prepared MOMO Ferrari with co-drivers Mauro Baldi, Arie Luyendyk and Giampiero Moretti. His 2002 Daytona victory came in the Doran Lista Dallara Judd with co-drivers Baldi, Fredy Lienhard and Max Papis.

His 1998 season was a record-setter, as in addition to winning Daytona and Sebring, Theys also won the Six Hours of Watkins Glen.

He also finished second overall in the FIA Sportscar Championship that year, winning at Paul Ricard, France.

2000–2002 seasons
In addition to his Grand-Am driver championship in 2002, Theys finished third in the driver point standings in that series in 2001 and was the runner-up in 2000. He had four victories in his championship 2002 season, and established the largest margin of victory in series history in winning the race at Mont-Tremblant, Quebec from the pole that year.

After 2002
Prior to retiring from pro racing in March 2009, Theys also competed in the Le Mans Series in Europe with Horag Racing from 2005 through 2008, winning the Monza 1,000 km race in the LMP2 category in 2007 and a similar event at the Nürburgring in 2005 in a Lola Judd. He finished his pro driving career in the Horag Racing-prepared Lista Office Porsche RS Spyder in the Le Mans Series' LMP2 division in 2008, finishing second in class at Spa and Silverstone, third at Monza and winning the Michelin Energy Challenge that season.

Theys also drove a Maserati MC 12 for Doran Racing in the ALMS in 2007, an effort that stunned the GT1 class when it beat the factory Corvettes to win the pole at the Petit Le Mans that year.

Accomplishments
Upon his retirement from driving professionally, Theys had finished on the podium 61 times in sports car races all over the world, with 18 victories, 22 second-place finishes and 21 third-place finishes through the end of the 2008 season.  He has the most professional victories of anyone in a Ferrari 333 SP with 10.

He received the prestigious Driver of the Year Award in his native Belgium in 2002.

Post-retirement
Theys currently works as a racing driver coach and consultant. He is also the Driving Director of DrivingXllence, an automotive event company that allows guests to experience the exhilaration and adrenaline of being behind the wheel of the world's newest and best Supercars.

Personal
Although he never gave up his Belgium citizenship, Theys resides in Scottsdale, Ariz., for many years, and still lives there. That municipality honored him with the keys to the city in honor of his GRAND-AM driver championship and second 24 Hours of Daytona victory.
He is married to Florence Richardson.

Racing record

Complete 24 Hours of Le Mans results

American open–wheel racing results
(key)

Formula Super Vee

PPG Indycar Series

(key) (Races in bold indicate pole position)

References 
Didier Theys' IndyCar statistics
Didier Theys' ARS (Indy Lights) statistics

External links
 

1956 births
Living people
People from Nivelles
Belgian racing drivers
Formula Ford drivers
FIA European Formula 3 Championship drivers
French Formula Three Championship drivers
German Formula Three Championship drivers
World Sportscar Championship drivers
European Formula Two Championship drivers
World Touring Car Championship drivers
European Touring Car Championship drivers
Champ Car drivers
Indianapolis 500 drivers
Indy Lights champions
Indy Lights drivers
SCCA Formula Super Vee drivers
Formula Super Vee Champions
24 Hours of Le Mans drivers
24 Hours of Daytona drivers
Rolex Sports Car Series drivers
American Le Mans Series drivers
European Le Mans Series drivers
24 Hours of Spa drivers
12 Hours of Sebring drivers
Belgian expatriate sportspeople in the United States
Chip Ganassi Racing drivers
Sportspeople from Walloon Brabant
Team Joest drivers
Oreca drivers
KTR drivers
A. J. Foyt Enterprises drivers
Audi Sport drivers
Porsche Motorsports drivers